Hilmi Cem İntepe (born 19 May 1992) is a Turkish actor and the winner of the 2013 season Survivor: Ünlüler vs. Gönüllüler.

Life and career 
Hilmi Cem İntepe was born in 1992 in Menteşe, Muğla. He lived in Bodrum until the age of 18. At the age of 17, he started learning Latin dance and won a few local competitions. He made his debut on television as a dancer with Yetenek Sizsiniz Türkiye, the Turkish version of Got Talent. He rose to fame upon winning the 2013 season of Survivor: Ünlüler vs. Gönüllüler.

He made his debut as an actor with a supporting role on Muhteşem Yüzyıl as Yavuz. He continued his career with a recurring role in Çalıkuşu. In 2014, he had his cinematic debut and appeared in two movies: Stajyer Mafya and Çılgın Dersane 4: Ada. In 2016, he had his first leading role with the Bodrum Masalı TV series. In 2018, he portrayed Vecihi Hürkuş in the historical drama movie Hürkuş: Göklerdeki Kahraman.

Filmography

Television

Film

Contests

References

External links 
 
 

1992 births
Turkish male film actors
Turkish male television actors
Living people